Slavko Beda (17 October 1919 – 8 June 1975) was a Croatian footballer who played internationally for the Croatian national team.

Club career
He started his career in Zagreb, where he finish his studies, with Graničar Zagreb in 1935, and a year later he joins Concordia Zagreb, debuting for the first team in 1938 and stayed with the club until its disbanding by the new communist Yugoslav regime in 1945. He was champion of the Croatian First League with Concordia in 1942. After the war, he played with Dinamo Zagreb between 1945 and 1947. Due to health problems he ended up his career being 28.

International career
Beda was capped once for Croatia in a match away against Slovakia in 1941.

Personal life
His younger brother, Oskar Beda, also played football, as goalkeeper he played with Concordia and HŠK Uskok.

References

External links
 

1919 births
1975 deaths
People from the Municipality of Ljubno
Association football wingers
Yugoslav footballers
Croatian footballers
Croatia international footballers
HŠK Concordia players
GNK Dinamo Zagreb players
Yugoslav First League players